La Celia (() elevation 1480m) is a town and municipality in the Department of Risaralda, Colombia.

References

Municipalities of Risaralda Department